Family Drama is a 2021 Indian Telugu-language Neo-noir film written and directed by Meher Tej. The film is produced by Chashma Films, Noothana Bharathi Films, and Mango Mass Media. It stars Suhas and Teja Kasarapu. The film was premiered on 29 October 2021 on the streaming service SonyLIV.

Plot
Sanjay Ratha constantly insults his newly-wed younger son Lakshman (Teja Kasarapu) and his wife (Shruti Meher) to domestic violence. Lakshman's brother Rama (Suhas) is a serial killer who has been banished from the family. When his father's toxic behaviour becomes too much to bear, Lakshman plans something dangerous in collaboration with Rama. What is it? is the rest of the film.

Cast 
 Suhas as Rama
 Teja Kasarapu as Lakshman
 Pooja Kiran
 Sruti Meher Nori
 Sanjay Ratha
 Anusha Nuthula as Mahati

References

External links 
 
 Ott play review of Family Drama: 
 Bollywood Life review of Family drama: 

2021 films
2021 thriller films
Indian comedy films
2020s Telugu-language films
Films shot in Hyderabad, India
Films set in Hyderabad, India